Oda Theatre, literally Chamber Theatre, is a theatre in Ulus quarter of Altındağ district in Ankara, Turkey. It is operated by the Turkish State Theatres, as it located in the same building of the Evkaf Apartmanı, in which the head office of the Turkish State Theaters is situated. The building also houses the Küçük Theatre. 

Theatres in Ankara
Ulus, Ankara
Turkish State Theatres